"Riptide" is the fourth single from Sick Puppies' third album Tri-Polar, which impacted radio on 8 February 2011. Originally this song was planned to be the second single, but "Odd One" narrowly beat out "Riptide" because of its strong lyrical message.

Music video
A music video was premiered on 6 April 2011 on Yahoo music. The video features the band playing in front of a lot of T.V's screening the most shocking breaking news and the iniquities in the world. At the end of the video a child turns off the T.V. and it shows a phrase saying: "There is still hope".
It was directed by Travis Kopach.

The video went to No. 7 on Yahoo Videos

Chart performance
"Riptide" debuted at No. 35 on the Mainstream Rock chart and peaked at No. 3; it debut at No. 49 on the Rock Songs chart, where it peaked at No. 6. It debuted at No. 36 on the Alternative Songs chart.

Track listing

Charts

Weekly charts

Year-end charts

References

Sick Puppies songs
2011 singles
2009 songs
Song recordings produced by Rock Mafia
Songs written by Shimon Moore
Virgin Records singles
Songs written by Tim James (musician)
Songs written by Antonina Armato
Songs written by Emma Anzai